Muiris mac Donnchadh Ulltach Ó Duinnshléibhe, aka Father Muiris Ulltach, Irish cleric, fl. 1602-1630s.

Father Muiris Ulltach had attended Aodh Ruadh Ó Domhnaill (d. 1602) on his death-bed in Simancas Castle, Spain, with Father Muiris mac Seaán Ulltach Ó Duinnshléibhe and Archbishop of Tuam Fláithrí Ó Maol Chonaire. The Annals of the Four Masters, in their account of the incident, describe him as a poor friar of the order of St. Francis, from the convent of the monastery of [the town of] Donegal, which was one of O'Donnell's fortresses.

In the 1630s both he and Muiris mac Seaán Ulltach Ó Duinnshléibhe were attached to the Franciscan convent at Bundrowes, and became acquainted with Mícheál Ó Cléirigh, who was then compiling the Annals of the Four Masters. Father Muiris's recollections of events, including the death of Ó Domhnaill, were incorporated into the compilation.

See also
 Donnchadh mac Eoghan Ó Duinnshléibhe, died 1527.

References
 The Annals of the Four Masters: Irish history, kingship and society in the early seventeenth century, p. 39, 186–7, 246, Bernadette Cunningham, Four Courts Press, 2010. .

External links
 http://www.ucc.ie/celt/published/T100005F/

17th-century Irish Roman Catholic priests
People from County Donegal
People of Elizabethan Ireland